Luck is a chance happening.

Luck may also refer to:

Places 
 Luck, North Carolina, United States
 Luck (town), Wisconsin, United States
 Luck, Wisconsin, a village within the town
 Luck Lake, Highlands County, Florida, U.S.
 Luck Nunatak, Ellsworth Land, Antarctica
 Luck Point, Bay of Isles, South Georgia
 Lutsk, Ukraine (Polish: Łuck)

People 
 Lück, a German family name
 Luck (surname), a family name
 DJ Luck, of the British musical duo Luck & Neat
 Luck Mervil (born 1967), Haitian-Canadian actor and singer-songwriter

Arts, entertainment, and media

Films
 Luck (1923 film), an American silent film directed by C.C. Burr
 Luck (1931 film), a French drama film
 Luck (2009 film), a Bollywood action thriller
 Luck (2022 film), an American animated comedy film

Music
 Luck (Aco album), 2012
 Luck (EP), a 2000 EP by New Zealand band Minuit
 Luck (Jacob Yates and the Pearly Gate Lock Pickers album)
 Luck (Tom Vek album), 2014
 Luck, album by The Storys 2010
 "Luck" (song), a 2014 song by American Authors
 "Luck", a 1991 song by Supersuckers from The Smoke of Hell

Other uses in arts, entertainment, and media
 "Luck" (short story), an 1886 story by Mark Twain
 Luck (TV series), a 2012 U.S. drama series about horse racing

See also
 
 Bad luck (disambiguation)
 "Be Lucky", a 2014 song by The Who
 Good luck (disambiguation)
 Lucka (disambiguation)
 Lucks (disambiguation)
 Lucky (disambiguation)
 Moral luck
 "Unlucky", a song by Axium from The Story Thus Far
 "Unlucky", a song by Sponge from the 2005 album The Man
 "Unlucky", a song by IU from her 2019 EP Love Poem